Holland's schema theorem, also called the fundamental theorem of genetic algorithms, is an inequality that results from coarse-graining an equation for evolutionary dynamics.  The Schema Theorem says that short, low-order schemata with above-average fitness increase exponentially in frequency in successive generations. The theorem was proposed by John Holland in the 1970s. It was initially widely taken to be the foundation for explanations of the power of genetic algorithms. However, this interpretation of its implications has been criticized in several publications reviewed in, where the Schema Theorem is shown to be a special case of the Price equation with the schema indicator function as the macroscopic measurement.  

A schema is a template that identifies a subset of strings with similarities at certain string positions. Schemata are a special case of cylinder sets, and hence form a topological space.

Description 

Consider binary strings of length 6. The schema 1*10*1 describes the set of all strings of length 6 with 1's at positions 1, 3 and 6 and a 0 at position 4. The * is a wildcard symbol, which means that positions 2 and 5 can have a value of either 1 or 0. The order of a schema  is defined as the number of fixed positions in the template, while the defining length  is the distance between the first and last specific positions. The order of 1*10*1 is 4 and its defining length is 5. The fitness of a schema is the average fitness of all strings matching the schema. The fitness of a string is a measure of the value of the encoded problem solution, as computed by a problem-specific evaluation function. Using the established methods and genetic operators of genetic algorithms, the schema theorem states that short, low-order schemata with above-average fitness increase exponentially in successive generations. Expressed as an equation:

The probability of disruption  is the probability that crossover or mutation will destroy the schema . Under the assumption that , it can be expressed as:

So a schema with a shorter defining length  is less likely to be disrupted.An often misunderstood point is why the Schema Theorem is an inequality rather than an equality.

Limitation

The schema theorem holds under the assumption of a genetic algorithm that maintains an infinitely large population, but does not always carry over to (finite) practice: due to sampling error in the initial population, genetic algorithms may converge on schemata that have no selective advantage. This happens in particular in multimodal optimization, where a function can have multiple peaks: the population may drift to prefer one of the peaks, ignoring the others.

The reason that the Schema Theorem cannot explain the power of genetic algorithms is that it holds for all problem instances, and cannot distinguish between problems in which genetic algorithms perform poorly, and problems for which genetic algorithms perform well.

References

 J. Holland, Adaptation in Natural and Artificial Systems, The MIT Press; Reprint edition 1992 (originally published in 1975).
 J. Holland, Hidden Order: How Adaptation Builds Complexity, Helix Books; 1996.

Genetic algorithms
Theorems in discrete mathematics